Bidhannagar Municipal School is a school in Bidhannagar (Salt Lake City), Kolkata, India. It is affiliated to West Bengal Board of Secondary Education and West Bengal Council of Higher Secondary Education

History 
The school was founded in 1997, with the first classes being held in Acharya Prafulla Chandra School, BK Block, Salt Lake. The school moved to its new building in FE Block soon afterwards. The inauguration ceremony was on 1 July 1999, led by West Bengal Finance Minister Dr. Ashim Dasgupta and Higher Education Minister Satyasadhan Chakraborty.

The four-story building has a triangular shape with a small courtyard in the middle. A playground is beside the main building. The school has laboratories and equipment for sports. It encourages students to take part in cultural programmes and inter-school competition, including painting and chess competitions.

Student life 
The school has a primary department and a high school department up to 12th standard. It gives its students the option to study in Bengali or English. At the +2 level, there are Science, Humanities and Commerce streams.

Students participate in an intra-school cultural event and competition every year known as the Shikhharthi Utsav (students' festival), and Foundation Day is celebrated every year on 1 July. Soccer championships, kabaddi competitions, quizzes and an annual sports day are held.

References

Primary schools in West Bengal
High schools and secondary schools in West Bengal
Schools in Kolkata
Educational institutions established in 1997
1997 establishments in West Bengal